The George is the name of many inns, hotels and public houses in the
UK.  It may also be a common shortening of The George and Dragon.  Notable examples include:

The George, Southwark, London
The George, Hammersmith, London
The George, Dublin
The George, one of the public houses and inns in Grantham

Other uses 
The schooner George, captured by the privateer Fly in 1817
George Washington Bridge, commonly nicknamed The George